Lap Chi Chu is a New York City and Los Angeles based lighting designer known for his Off-Broadway works.

Career

Off Broadway 

Source:

Teaching 

Chu taught at California Institute of the Arts from 2001–2020. He is currently a professor and the Head of Lighting at the UCLA School of Theater, Film and Television.

Personal life

Chu married Rebecca Wisocky in Boston on October 10, 2015.

Awards and nominations 
Chu's lighting for Mlima’s Tale earned him the Lucille Lortel Award for Best Lighting in 2019 and an Outer Critics Circle Award nomination in 2018. Also in 2018, he received an Obie for Sustained Excellence in Lighting Design and a Berkshire Theatre Critics Association Award for Outstanding Lighting Design for Dangerous House. In 2009, Chu was nominated for a Lucille Lortel Award for his lighting of The Good Negro.

References

External links 
Lap Chi Chu Website

Place of birth missing (living people)
Living people
People from New York (state)
People from Los Angeles
Year of birth missing (living people)